Mariano Martínez may refer to:

 Mariano Martínez (cyclist) (born 1948), French former professional road racing cyclist
 Mariano Martínez (actor) (born 1978), Argentine actor and model
 Mariano Martinez (entrepreneur) (born 1944), Mexican American inventor, entrepreneur and restaurateur
 Mariano Martínez (footballer)